Oliver Broome (born 6 February 1937) is a Barbadian cricketer. He played in one first-class match for the Barbados cricket team in 1964/65.

See also
 List of Barbadian representative cricketers

References

External links
 

1937 births
Living people
Barbadian cricketers
Barbados cricketers
People from Saint Peter, Barbados